Uhu (meaning Eagle owl in English) was a monthly magazine published between 1924 and 1934 in Berlin by Ullstein Verlag. It is seen retrospectively as a pioneering publication of the Weimar period.

History and profile
The first issue of Uhu appeared in October 1924. Long before other publications Uhu showed trends in culture and science that later became manifest, such as the importance of broadcasting and television. Literary talents such as Fritz Kahn, who became famous later with his visualizations of body functions, or the futurist Ludwig Kapeller found their most important publication platform in the magazine. The articles were illustrated with great effort. In the Uhu, among other things, photographs of Erich Salomon were printed, one of the first photographers known to a larger audience. In October 1929 the magazine sold more than 200,000 copies.

The magazine took an early stand against the national socialists. This was mainly reflected in the form of cartoons such as "Hitler receives the Nobel Peace Prize 1932". The magazine's social focus was occasionally conservative. Hugo Sellheim, the gynecologist, concluded in an article on women and sports that women were able to take personal defeats in competition, which distorted their facial expressions unfavorably; and that women's participation is sports was detrimental to fertility. Sellheim therefore advised women to abstain from sports.

References

Defunct magazines published in Germany
Magazines established in 1924
Magazines disestablished in 1934
Magazines published in Berlin
Monthly magazines published in Germany